Samuel Edward-Cook is an English actor, known for his roles as Walter Storey in the BBC drama series Land Girls (2009), as Danny Whizz-Bang in the BBC drama series Peaky Blinders (2013), and as DC Steve Beckton in the ITV drama series Innocent (2018).

Filmography

Television

Radio

Stage

References

External links
 
 

21st-century English male actors
Alumni of RADA
English male stage actors
English male film actors
English male television actors
Year of birth missing (living people)
Living people